Howard Murray Boogher (January 2, 1876 – March, 1933) was a college football player, attorney, and once president of the Boogher, Force & Goodbar Hat Company. Boogher was captain of the Southern Intercollegiate Athletic Association champion 1897 Vanderbilt Commodores football team. He and Phil Connell dove to recover the ball after the victory in the school's rivalry game with Sewanee in 1897.

References

External links

1876 births
1933 deaths
Players of American football from St. Louis
Vanderbilt Commodores football players
19th-century players of American football
American football ends